Leslie MacDonald Gill (6 October 1884 – 14 January 1947), commonly known as MacDonald Gill or Max Gill, was a noted early-twentieth-century British graphic designer, cartographer, artist and architect.

Biography

Born in Brighton, Gill was the younger brother of Eric Gill, one of the leading figures of the Arts and Crafts movement.

In 1914 his Wonderground Map, commissioned by Frank Pick, and hung at every station, helped to promote the London Underground by presenting an accurate map which also had a humorous side in cartoon style. Produced in poster form, it was also made available for sale to members of the public and proved to be very popular. Elder brother Eric, who at that time was engaged in a commission for Westminster Cathedral, was included at the bottom of the map. Gill showed three works at the first annual exhibition of the newly formed Society of Graphic Art in 1921.

He was the designer of the standard upper-case lettering used on headstones and war memorials by the Imperial War Graves Commission. But it is perhaps his illustrated maps for which he is most well known. These maps have featured in a series of exhibitions including Magnificent Maps exhibition in 2010 at the British Library, an exhibition, MacDonald Gill, Out of the Shadows, in 2011 at the University of Brighton and at the Mind the Map exhibition in 2012 at the London Transport Museum.

Gallery

References

External links

Official website
University of Brighton Design Archives: MacDonald 'Max' Gill – A Digital Resource 2011
 Map Roman (digital font by David Jonathan Ross based on MacDonald Gill's style of lettering)

1884 births
1947 deaths
20th-century English artists
20th-century British sculptors
Alumni of the Central School of Art and Design
Artists from Brighton
British letter cutters
English cartographers
English graphic designers
English illustrators
English male sculptors
English typographers and type designers
People educated at The Prebendal School
20th-century English male artists